Kaumudi (Sanskrit: kaumudī "enlightenment, illumination, explanatory commentary") may refer to:
 Vijñānakaumudī, work by Ananda Bhatta
 Siddhāntakaumudī, work by Bhaṭṭoji Dīkṣita
 Kaumudī Mahotsava, work by an unknown Indian poet (circa 3rd century CE)
 Sambad Kaumudi, Bengali newspaper (1819–1836)
 Kerala Kaumudi, Malayalam newspaper
 Kaumudi (magazine), Gujarati language literary magazine (1924–1937)